Félix Quesada Mas (1 July 1902 – 9 July 1959) was a Spanish professional association football player. He was born in Madrid, Spain.

He played as a defender spending the most of his career at Real Madrid C.F. He scored 33 goals in 244 matches for the club.

During his career at the club he won 12 zonal championships, 2 La Liga. He played 9 times for Spain national football team and scored once.

External links
 Félix Quesada at Real madrid Legends.
 
 

Spanish footballers
Spain international footballers
Real Madrid CF players
Spanish football managers
Spain national football team managers
1902 births
1959 deaths
Association football defenders